Piletocera holophaealis is a moth in the family Crambidae. It was described by George Hampson in 1917. It is found in Papua New Guinea.

References

holophaealis
Endemic fauna of Papua New Guinea
Moths of Papua New Guinea
Moths described in 1917
Taxa named by George Hampson